Pates is a community in Robeson County, North Carolina, United States.

History 

Pates is located in western Robeson County. According to historian William McKee Evans, it was preceded by a village known as Eureka. The community of Pates was established around 1880 by Russell W. Livermore, who settled on the land of a dead friend. It was named for a railway worker, Ed Pates. The community was incorporated in 1883, though in time its municipal government became inactive. By 1884 the town hosted a railway station and approximately 100 inhabitants. In 1887 the Croatan Normal School was founded, and its first buildings were established in Pates. The institution later moved to Pembroke.

References 

Unincorporated communities in Robeson County, North Carolina
Lumbee